Shuangmiao Township is a township of Qingfeng County in northeastern Henan province, China, located about  northeast of Hualong District, Puyang. , it has 29 villages under its administration.

See also 
 List of township-level divisions of Henan

References 

Township-level divisions of Henan